The Film Emotional Atyachar is a 2010 Indian Hindi-language black comedy film, directed by Akshay Shere and produced by Vijay Gutte. It stars Ranvir Shorey, Mohit Ahlawat, Kalki Koechlin and Ravi Kishan in the lead roles along with Vinay Pathak, Snehal Dabi, Abhimanyu Singh, Sakshi Gulati and Shubha Khote.

Plot
Joe and Leslie, gangster Junior Bhai and his gang members, gambler Bosco and Sophie, Aishwariya and Vikram Jaiswal are all chasing a money bag. All running live on Mumbai-Goa highway.

Cast
Snehal Dabi... as Goti
Ranvir Shorey... as Leslie
Teddy Maurya... as Gun Dealer
Vinay Pathak... as Joe
Shobha Khote... as Joe's Mother
Mohit Ahlawat... as Vikram Jaiswal
Sakshi Gulati... as Aishwariya
Kalki Koechlin... as Sophie
Ravi Kishan... as Junior Bhai
Abhimanyu Singh...as Bosco
Nasser Abdullah....as Khanna 
Anand Tiwari.... as Hiten Sardesai
Pankaj Kalra
Rajkumar Kanojia
Shiv Kumar Subramaniam.... as Special Appearance
 Hyaat Aasif

Critical reception
Nikhat Kazmi from The Times of India rated the film 2.5 out of 5 saying, "Quirky as it comes, but not enough of crookedness to pitch it in the league of Johnny Gaddar and the likes, Emotional Atyachar is a black comedy that mostly ends up grey". Sukanya Verma from Rediff.com rated the film 1 out of 5 and said, "The only decent thing about this Atyachar is that it wraps up in about 90 minutes".

Track list

References

External links

2010s Hindi-language films
Indian black comedy films
Indian crime thriller films
Indian gangster films
Indian crime comedy films
2010 black comedy films
2010s crime comedy films
2010 crime thriller films
2010 films